This is a list of public art in the London Borough of Barking and Dagenham.


Barking 

London Bridge Stones

In 2007, two small stones from remains of the old medieval London Bridge were joined together in a sculpture in front of St Margaret's church facing the Barking Abbey ruins as part of several public artworks placed in Barking Town Centre by artist Joost van Santen.

Dagenham

References

Bibliography

External links
 

Barking and Dagenham
Barking and Dagenham
Tourist attractions in the London Borough of Barking and Dagenham